Benjamin Jones may refer to:

Benjamin Jones (congressman) (1787–1861), U.S. Representative from Ohio
Benjamin Jones (cyclist) (1882–1963), British track cyclist
Benjamin Jones (author), 19th century author, see 1824 in Wales
Benjamin Jones (rugby player), full back for Coca-Cola Red Sparks
Benjamin F. Jones (born 1966), American historian and academic administrator
Benjamin Jones (economist) (born 1972), professor at Kellogg School of Management
Benjamin Franklin Jones (New Jersey politician) (1869–1935), Speaker of the New Jersey General Assembly
Benjamin Franklin Jones (industrialist) (1824–1903), pioneer of the iron and steel industry in Pittsburgh
Benjamin Franklin Jones Cottage in Pennsylvania
Benjamin R. Jones (1906–1980), Chief Justice of the Pennsylvania Supreme Court
Benny Jones (Thomas Benjamin Jones, 1920–1972), English footballer
Benny Jones (baseball), American baseball player
Ben Jones (co-operator) (1847–1942), British co-operator
Detective Sergeant Benjamin "Ben" Jones, a fictional character played by Jason Hughes in the UK TV series Midsomer Murders

See also
Ben Jones (disambiguation)